Slotkin is a surname. Notable people with the surname include:

 Elissa Slotkin (born 1976), American politician
 Richard Slotkin (born 1942), American historian
 Stanley Slotkin (1905–1997), American businessman